The City Municipality of Kranj is one of twelve city municipalities of Slovenia. It lies in northwestern Slovenia and was established in 1994. Its seat is the city of Kranj. The area traditionally belongs to the region of Upper Carniola and has been included in Upper Carniola Statistical Region since 1995.

Settlements

In addition to the municipal seat of Kranj, the municipality also include the following settlements:

 Babni Vrt
 Bobovek
 Breg ob Savi
 Britof
 Čadovlje
 Čepulje
 Golnik
 Goriče
 Hrastje
 Ilovka
 Jama
 Jamnik
 Javornik
 Kokrica
 Lavtarski Vrh
 Letenice
 Mavčiče
 Meja
 Mlaka pri Kranju
 Nemilje
 Njivica
 Orehovlje
 Pangršica
 Planica
 Podblica
 Podreča
 Povlje
 Praše
 Predoslje
 Pševo
 Rakovica
 Spodnja Besnica
 Spodnje Bitnje
 Srakovlje
 Srednja Vas–Goriče
 Srednje Bitnje
 Suha pri Predosljah
 Šutna
 Sveti Jošt nad Kranjem
 Tatinec
 Tenetiše
 Trstenik
 Žablje
 Žabnica
 Zabukovje
 Zalog
 Zgornja Besnica
 Zgornje Bitnje

References

External links

City Municipality of Kranj on Geopedia
Official site

 
Kranj
1994 establishments in Slovenia